Labour History: A Journal of Labour and Social History is a peer-review academic journal of labour history in Australasia. The journal was established in 1962 as the Bulletin of the Australian Society for the Study of Labour History by the Australian Society for the Study of Labour History (ASSLH), but was renamed Labour History in 1963. The ASSLH published the journal until 2018, after which the Society joined with Liverpool University Press. The journal is edited by Diane Kirkby (La Trobe University).

Labour History Editors 

 Nos 1-3 (January-November 1962) – Eric Fry
 Nos 4-5 (May-November 1963) – Bob Gollan and B.D. Shields
 No. 6 (May 1964) – E.C. Fry; J.S. Hagan; B.J. MacFarlane; B.D. Shields
 No. 7 (November 1964) – E.C. Fry; J.S. Hagan; B.J. MacFarlane; J. Merritt
 No. 8 (May 1965) – R.A Gollan; J.S. Hagan; B.J. McFarlane
 Nos 9-10 (November 1965-May 1966) – B.J. McFarlane; E.C. Fry; J.S. Hagan
 Nos 11-14 (November 1966-May 1968) – B.J. McFarlane; N. Bede Nairn; Robert Cooksey
 Nos 15-16 (November 1968-May 1969) – B.J. McFarlane; J. Molony; N. Bede Nairn; Robert Cooksey
 No. 18 (May 1970) – J.D. Ritchie; J. Molony; N. Bede Nairn; G. Osborne
 Nos 19-22 (November 1970-May 1972) – J.D. Ritchie
 No. 23 (November 1972) – Jill Waterhouse
 No. 24 (May 1973) – special edition Strikes: Studies in Twentieth Century Australian Social History – J. Iremonger; J. Merritt; G. Osborne
 Nos 25-8 (November 1973-May 1975) – David Walker
 No. 29 (November 1975) – special edition Women at Work – Ann Curthoys; Susan Eade; and Peter Spearritt
 Nos 30-43 (May 1976-November 1977-November 1982) – John Merritt
 No. 44 (May 1983) –  Susan Allen
 Nos 45-49 (November 1983-November 1985) – John Merritt
 No. 50 (May 1986) – John Merritt; John Knott
 Nos 51-57 (November 1986-November 1989) – Ken Buckley
 Nos 58-72 (May 1990-November 1998) – Terry Irving
 Nos 76-99 (May 1999-November 2010) – Greg Patmore
 No. 100 (May 2011) – John Shields (with Cathy Brigden, Greg Patmore, Nikki Balnave, Lucy Taksa)
 Nos 101-110 (November 2011-May 2016) – John Shields
 Nos 111- (November 2016-current) – Diane Kirkby

Special Issues 
No. 17 (November 1969) – The Great Depression in Australia – Robert Cooksey

Not numbered (1978) 'Jack Lang' – Heather Radi; Peter Spearritt

No. 35 (November 1978) 'Who are our enemies? Racism and the working class in Australia' – Ann Curthoys; Andrew Markus

Not numbered (1978) 'Labour in Conflict: The 1949 Coal Strike' – Phillip Deery

No. 61 (November 1991) 'Women, Work, and the Labour Movement in Australia and Aotearoa/New Zealand' – Raelene Frances; Bruce Scates

No. 69 (November 1995) 'Aboriginal Workers' – Ann McGrath; Kay Saunders; Jackie Huggins

No. 71 (November 1996) Comparative Labour History: Australia and Canada, Labour/Le Travail – Greg Kealey; Greg Patmore

No. 106 (May 2014) 'Labour and the Great War: The Australian Working Class and the Making of ANZAC' – Frank Bongiorno, Raelene Frances, Bruce Scates

Indexing and abstracting
The journal is indexed and abstracted in the following bibliographic databases:

References

External links

Publications established in 1962
Biannual journals
History journals
English-language journals
Labour journals